Luke Schlemmer (born 25 January 1995) is a South African professional cricketer. He made his first-class debut for KwaZulu-Natal Inland in the 2016–17 Sunfoil 3-Day Cup on 20 October 2016. He made his List A debut for KwaZulu-Natal Inland in the 2016–17 CSA Provincial One-Day Challenge on 27 November 2016. He made his Twenty20 debut for KwaZulu-Natal Inland in the 2018 Africa T20 Cup on 15 September 2018.

He was the leading run-scorer for KwaZulu-Natal Inland in the 2018–19 CSA 3-Day Provincial Cup, with 602 runs in nine matches. He was also the leading run-scorer for KwaZulu-Natal Inland in the 2018–19 CSA Provincial One-Day Challenge, with 344 runs in ten matches. In April 2021, he was named in KwaZulu-Natal Inland's squad, ahead of the 2021–22 cricket season in South Africa.

References

External links
 

1995 births
Living people
South African cricketers
KwaZulu-Natal Inland cricketers
Cricketers from Durban